Joy Lusenaka (born 25 February 1991 in Bungoma, Kenya) is a Kenyan volleyball player. She is part of the Kenya women's national volleyball team as a setter.  She competed in the 2020 Summer Olympic Games under captain Mercy Moim.

She participated at the 2013 FIVB Volleyball Women's U23 World Championship, and at the 2018 FIVB Volleyball Women's World Championship.

References

External links 

 Joy Lusenaka - Player Info Global Sports Archive

1991 births
Living people
Kenyan women's volleyball players
Volleyball players at the 2020 Summer Olympics
Olympic volleyball players of Kenya